The West Indies cricket team toured New Zealand and Australia from November 1930 to March 1931 and played a five-match Test series against the Australia national cricket team.  Australia won the series 4–1. Australia were captained by Bill Woodfull, while the West Indies were coached by Jackie Grant. In addition, the West Indians played nine first-class matches against Australian state teams and, in November, one match in New Zealand against Wellington.

Team

 Jackie Grant (captain)
 Lionel Birkett (vice-captain)
 Ivan Barrow
 Barto Bartlett
 Learie Constantine
 Frank de Caires
 George Francis
 Herman Griffith
 George Headley
 Errol Hunte
 Frank Martin
 Clifford Roach
 Tommy Scott
 Derek Sealy
 Edwin St Hill
 Vibart Wight

The manager was R. H. Mallett.

New Zealand series summary

Test series summary

First Test

Second Test

Third Test

Fourth Test

Fifth Test

References

External links
 West Indies in Australia and New Zealand 1930-31 at CricketArchive
 West Indies to Australia 1930-31 at Test Cricket Tours

Annual reviews
 Wisden Cricketers' Almanack 1932

Further reading
 Bill Frindall, The Wisden Book of Test Cricket 1877-1978, Wisden, 1979
 Chris Harte, A History of Australian Cricket, Andre Deutsch, 1993
 Ray Robinson, On Top Down Under, Cassell, 1975

1930 in Australian cricket
1930 in New Zealand cricket
1930 in West Indian cricket
1931 in Australian cricket
1931 in West Indian cricket
Australian cricket seasons from 1918–19 to 1944–45
International cricket competitions from 1918–19 to 1945
New Zealand cricket seasons from 1918–19 to 1944–45
1930-31
1930